Ray Elgin Teal (January 12, 1902 – April 2, 1976) was an American actor. His most famous role was as Sheriff Roy Coffee on the television series Bonanza (1959–1972), which was only one of dozens of sheriffs on television and in movies that he played during his long and prolific career stretching from 1937 to 1970. He appeared in pictures such as Western Jamboree (1938) with Gene Autry, The Best Years of Our Lives (1946) with Fredric March and Myrna Loy, The Black Arrow (1948), Billy Wilder's Ace in the Hole (1951) and Judgment at Nuremberg (1961) with Spencer Tracy and Burt Lancaster.

Early life
Teal was born in Grand Rapids, Michigan. A saxophone player, he worked his way through the University of California, Los Angeles as a bandleader before becoming an actor.

Acting career
His longest-running role was as Sheriff Roy Coffee, a law-enforcing sheriff on Bonanza. Teal was one of the most senior members of the crew having a permanent role. He had also played a sheriff in the Billy Wilder film Ace in the Hole (1951). Teal co-starred in numerous TV westerns throughout his career: he appeared five times on Cheyenne, four times on The Lone Ranger, on The Alaskans, three times in different roles on another long-running western series, Wagon Train, on NBC's Tales of Wells Fargo, on the ABC western series Broken Arrow, five times on the ABC western comedy Maverick, sometimes playing a villain, on the CBS western series The Texan, the NBC western series The Californians, twice on Colt .45, once on Wanted: Dead or Alive and as "Sheriff Clay" for a single 1960 episode of the NBC western series Riverboat, and four times on a western series about the rodeo titled Wide Country.

After more than 15 years performing in films and in early television, Teal secured a recurring role as a police officer in the 1953–1955 ABC sitcom with a variety-show theme, Where's Raymond?, later renamed The Ray Bolger Show.

In 1955, Teal appeared as McCanles, a ruthless cattle baron in the episode "Julesburg" of the ABC/Warner Bros. Western series, Cheyenne. Altogether, Teal appeared five times on Cheyenne.  He later appeared in a guest-starring role in another ABC/WB Western series, The Alaskans. From 1957 to 1962, Teal was cast three times in different roles on the Western series, Wagon Train. He also appeared in a number of episodes of Bat Masterson, an episode of The Rifleman and later in Green Acres.

In 1957, Teal played a lawman, Captain McNelly, in the episode "Sam Bass" of NBC's Tales of Wells Fargo. Teal was cast as Fenster in "The Bounty Hunters" (1957) on the ABC Western series, Broken Arrow.

In 1958, Teal guest-starred "No Tears for the Dead" on the CBS Western series, The Texan. He appeared too in the CBS sitcom, Dennis the Menace, starring Jay North. Also in 1958, Teal was cast as Yotts Meyer in the episode "Hangtown" of the NBC Western series, The Californians.

On the Warner Bros. series Maverick starring James Garner and Jack Kelly, Teal played a crooked sheriff in the episode "The Day They Hanged Bret Maverick" (1958) and also starred as villains in the episodes "Stage West" (1957) based on a story by Louis L'amour and "Two Beggars on Horseback" (1958).
 
In 1960 Teal was cast as Sheriff Roy Coffee in Bonanza, a role he played until 1972, appearing in 98 episodes, occasionally as the lead character. He also portrayed judge/dentist/shoe repairman H.G. Cogswell in Bat Masterson starring Gene Barry.

Teal appeared twice in another ABC/WB Western, Colt .45, playing Mike O'Tara in the series finale, "The Trespassers" (1960), 
 
In 1960, he was cast as Sheriff Clay in the episode "Zigzag" of the NBC Western series Riverboat. 
 
In 1962, Teal portrayed Mr. Todd in the episode entitled "The Tall Shadow" of the NBC modern Western drama, Empire. That same year, he was cast as Sam Thorpe in the episode "Step Forward" of the NBC police drama 87th Precinct. He portrayed in 1962 the character Alvin Greaves in "Unwanted: Dead or Alive" of the syndicated adventure series The Everglades. In 1962 and 1963, he was cast four times, three as the character Frank Higgins, on the Western series about the rodeo, Wide Country.

In 1963, Teal appeared as murder victim Joe Downing in the CBS courtroom drama series Perry Mason episode, "The Case of the Shifty Shoebox".

Teal was a bit-part player in Western films for several years before landing a minor role in Northwest Passage (1940). Another of his roles was as Little John in The Bandit of Sherwood Forest (1946). Notable film roles include playing one of the judges in Judgment at Nuremberg (1961) with Spencer Tracy and an indulgent bar owner to Marlon Brando's motorcycle gang in The Wild One (1953). This was the second of three times that Teal appeared with Brando, having done so already as a drunk in Brando's debut in The Men (1950) and later in Brando's only directorial effort, One-Eyed Jacks (1961), as a bartender.

Teal appeared in three episodes of the 1955–1957 anthology series, Crossroads, a study of clergymen from different denominations.

Death
He died of undisclosed causes on April 2, 1976, at age 74 in Santa Monica, California.

Selected filmography

Notes

References

External links

 
 
 Bonanza cast biographies

1902 births
1976 deaths
20th-century American male actors
20th-century American male musicians
20th-century American saxophonists
American bandleaders
American male film actors
American male saxophonists
American male television actors
Male Western (genre) film actors
Male actors from Grand Rapids, Michigan
Male actors from Santa Monica, California
Musicians from Santa Monica, California
University of California, Los Angeles alumni
Western (genre) television actors